Leskovec pri Krškem ( or) is a settlement on the right bank of the Sava River in the Municipality of Krško in eastern Slovenia. The area is part of the traditional region of Lower Carniola. It is now included with the rest of the municipality in the Lower Sava Statistical Region. It includes the hamlets of Grad (a.k.a. Turnska graščina), Beli Breg, Veliki Marof (in older sources also Gorenji Marof), and Žadovinka. Older sources also mention the appertaining hamlet of Bajer.

Name
The name of the settlement was changed from Leskovec to Leskovec pri Krškem in 1953. In the past the German name was Haselbach.

Landmarks

Churches

Parish church
The local parish church is dedicated to Our Lady of Sorrows and belongs to the Roman Catholic Diocese of Novo Mesto. It was erected in the early Renaissance style on the site of an earlier building, most probably in the 1630s. A Roman tombstone is included in the walls of the church and a milliarium of Septimius Severus is next to the church.

St. Anne's Church
A second church in the settlement is dedicated to Saint Anne and is a 17th-century building that was rebuilt in the late 18th century in a Late Baroque style.

Monuments
In front of the parish church stands a monument to the soldiers fallen in World War I. It was made by Franjo Kunovar Jr. and unveiled on 3 June 1928. In 1995 a plaque dedicated to the people exiled in World War II was added to it.

Leskovec Castle
On a hill to the north of the settlement stands Leskovec Castle, dating to the 15th century with 16th- and 18th-century alterations.

References

External links

Leskovec pri Krškem on Geopedia

Populated places in the Municipality of Krško